Rhabdosphaera clavigera is a marine, unicellular species of coccolithophore in the genus Rhabdosphaera. The species name references the Latin word claviger (one who carries a club) to describe the pentameral (five-point) spines emerging from the calcium carbonate coccosphere. The stylifera variant has shorter, thinner, and symmetrical spines, as compared to the type species.

References

Haptophyte species